Mudipalli is a village in the mandal of Nagari, in Chittoor district of the Indian state of Andhra Pradesh.

Villages in Chittoor district